The Nauru Pacific Line (NPL) is the national shipping line of the Republic of Nauru, founded in 1969. Its fleet consists of five owned and two leased ships, which travel throughout all of Oceania. It is loss-making and gets subventions from the state.

It is a member of the Pacific Forum Line, a joint venture between several national shipping lines established in 1977 after a dispute between the NPL and the Maritime Union of New Zealand.

See also
 Economy of Nauru
 Nauru Phosphate Corporation 
 Pacific Forum Line
 Republic of Nauru
Nauru Maritime Port Authority

References

Companies of Nauru
Transport in Nauru